Devrim (meaning Revolution in Turkish)  was the first ever automobile designed and produced in Turkey.

Automotive Industry Congress 
On 15 May 1961, the Otomotiv Endüstri Kongresi (Automotive Industry Congress) was opened by President Cemal Gürsel. In his inaugural speech, he said:

After the congress, Gürsel issued his order to build a prototype engine and car meeting the requirements of the country. These prototypes would be compared with the best cars of the time, the shortcomings would be identified, and project development work would be undertaken in order to produce the best possible car in Turkey.

Design and production of Devrim 
In 1961, President Cemal Gürsel ordered 24 engineers, working in various companies, to build a car fully designed and produced in Turkey. It was to be demonstrated during the Republic Day celebrations on October 29, 1961.

After 130 days of hasty labor at the workshop in Eskişehir, which later became the TÜLOMSAŞ factory, the engineers managed to make four prototypes of the automobile. One was black, and the others were cream coloured. It was named Devrim (the Turkish word for Revolution.)

The schedule was extremely tight; nonetheless, four cars could be completed and two of these cars (cream and black coloured) were shipped to Ankara for the Republic Day celebrations. The polishing paint of the black car was done while it was on the train to Ankara. None of the cars had gasoline in them, as a safety precaution, and the cars were filled with little fuel, only for maneuvering. Since the compression rate had been increased to boost engine performance, high octane fuel was needed to run the engines without engine knock. High octane fuel was only available in Ankara back then. On the day of the celebrations, President Cemal Gürsel got into the black car before it was refuelled for a ceremonial ride. After proceeding approximately a hundred meters, the vehicle came to a halt. Then the President got off from the black car and got onto the cream colored car at the back (which had been filled up earlier) and went to Anıtkabir with it. The two cars then completed the ceremonial runs without any problem. The newspaper headlines in the following day were, "Devrim went 100 meters and it broke down." The car became the subject of jokes for many years.

Devrim was never mass-produced, possibly because the cars were crafted prototypes and the production process was not well-documented, with only a few technical drawings remaining from the production phase. Another possible reason was the limited demand for cars in Turkey back in 1961, which made it difficult to feasibly accomplish the mass production, distribution, dealership services, maintenance services and spare parts production of a new car brand.

Conversely, the Otosan factory in Istanbul was established in 1959 as a joint venture between Ford Motor Company and Koç Holding, and Turkey's first mass-produced automobile brand, Anadol, started the serial production of the Anadol A1 in 1966.

Conspiracy theories 
A popular conspiracy theory about the failure of mass production suggests that the American automotive companies, which sold most of the cars in Turkey back in the early 1960s (e.g., the police cars in Turkey were mostly GM, Ford and Chrysler models, especially Chevrolet and Dodge, until the mid-1970s) had approached the Turkish government to cancel the project, and due to political and economic reasons, the latter gave priority to maintaining the close bilateral relations between the two NATO allies at the height of the Cold War.

Five years later, in 1966, Anadol became Turkey's first mass-produced automobile brand. Anadol vehicles were produced at the Otosan factory in Istanbul, which was established in 1959 as a joint venture between Ford Motor Company of the United States and Koç Holding of Turkey. In 1960 Otosan started the production of the Ford Consul, which was the first passenger car to be produced at the factory in Istanbul.

Legacy 
Three of the prototypes were scrapped due to the bureaucratic restrictions, their engines converted to diesel generators, but the last one (body no:002, engine no:002) is kept, in working condition, inside the TÜLOMSAŞ factory in Eskişehir, where it was built.

In 2018 when the automobile hit its 57 years, it was completely disassembled and thoroughly maintained by its original manufacturer TÜLOMSAŞ in order to preserve Devrim for many decades. Since it is preserved in a closed showroom very little rust was observed; though paint and vinyl interiors had to be replaced according to original specifications of the car.

Devrim is open for visit at the TÜLOMSAŞ factory in Eskişehir every day between 08:00-17:00.

In popular culture 
The story of the building process and hard efforts of the 24 engineers who worked on Devrim automobiles became the subject of a film, which was released in Turkey in 2008 with the title "Devrim Arabaları" (English: Cars of Revolution).

In late 2010, students from the National University of Science and Technology in Pakistan developed a hybrid car with inspiration from Devrim and named it Devrim II.

References

External links 

 Official page of Devrim 
 TÜLOMSAŞ page on Devrim 
 NTVMSNBC Article on Devrim
 Turkish Wikipedia article
 Turkish Wikipedia article about the movie
 Official movie page of Devrim (archived html)

Defunct motor vehicle manufacturers of Turkey
Cars introduced in 1961
Cars of Turkey